Undibacterium arcticum is a Gram-negative, aerobic, rod-shaped and motile bacterium from the genus of Undibacterium which has been isolated from soil from the arctic alpine from Longyearbyen in Svalbard.

References

External links
Type strain of Undibacterium arcticum at BacDive -  the Bacterial Diversity Metadatabase

Burkholderiales
Bacteria described in 2016